The 2009 Hanshin Tigers season features the Tigers quest to win their first Central League title since 2005.

Regular season

Standings

Game log

|- align="center" bgcolor="bbffbb"
| 1 || April 3 || Swallows || 5 - 2 || Ando (1-0) || Ishikawa (0-1) || Fujikawa (1) || 33,792 || 1-0-0
|-align="center" bgcolor="#ffbbbb"
| 2 || April 4 || Swallows || 1 - 5 || Sato (1-0) || Nomi (0-1) || || 33,449 || 1-1-0
|-align="center" bgcolor="#ffbbbb"
| 3 || April 5 || Swallows || 6 - 7 || Kawashima (1-0) || Fukuhara (0-1) || Lim (1) || 33,436 || 1-2-0
|- align="center" bgcolor="bbffbb"
| 4 || April 7 || Carp || 11 - 10 || Egusa (1-0) || Nagakawa (0-1) || || 46,307 || 2-2-0
|- align="center" bgcolor="bbffbb"
| 5 || April 8 || Carp || 8 - 2 || Shimoyanagi (1-0) || Saito (0-1) || || 42,300 || 3-2-0
|-align="center" bgcolor="#ffbbbb"
| 6 || April 9 || Carp || 2 - 4 || Hasegawa (1-0) || Ishikawa (0-1) || Nagakawa (3) || 38,733 || 3-3-0
|-align="center" bgcolor="#ffbbbb"
| 7 || April 10 || @Giants || 6 - 5 || Ochi (1-0) || Egusa (1-1) || Kroon (1) || 43,356 || 3-4-0
|-align="center" bgcolor="#ffbbbb"
| 8 || April 11 || @Giants || 4 - 1 || Tono (1-0) || Nomi (0-2) || Kroon (2) || 44,284 || 3-5-0
|-align="center" bgcolor="#bbbbbb"
| 9 || April 12 || @Giants || 6 - 6 (12) || colspan=3|Game tied after 12 innings || 44,246 || 3-5-1
|- align="center" bgcolor="#bbbbbb"
| — || April 14 || Dragons || colspan=6|Postponed (rained out)
|- align="center" bgcolor="#ffbbbb"
| 10 || April 15 || Dragons || 2 - 9 || Asakura (1-0) || Shimoyanagi (1-1) ||  || 40,476 || 3-6-1
|- align="center" bgcolor="bbffbb"
| 11 || April 16 || Dragons || 4 - 3 || Atchison (1-0) || Asao (1-2) || Fujikawa (2) || 40,195 || 4-6-1
|- align="center" bgcolor="bbffbb"
| 12 || April 17 || @BayStars || 1 - 5 || Ando (2-0) || Miura (1-2) ||  || 12,250 || 5-6-1
|- align="center" bgcolor="bbffbb"
| 13 || April 18 || @BayStars || 4 - 9 || Nomi (1-2) || Glynn (0-3) ||  || 25,773 || 6-6-1
|- align="center" bgcolor="#ffbbbb"
| 14 || April 19 || @BayStars || 4 - 2 || Kobayashi (1-1) || Fukuhara (0-2) || Ishii (4) || 24,491 || 6-7-1
|-align="center" bgcolor="#ffbbbb"
| 15 || April 21 || @Dragons || 2 - 1 || Asakura (2-0) || Shimoyanagi (1-2) || Iwase (3) || 30,434 || 6-8-1
|-align="center" bgcolor="#ffbbbb"
| 16 || April 22 || @Dragons || 6 - 2 || Asao (2-2) || Kubo (0-1) || Iwase (4) || 31,650 || 6-9-1
|-align="center" bgcolor="bbffbb"
| 17 || April 23 || @Dragons || 1 - 4 (12) || Fujikawa (1-0) || Nelson (0-2) ||  || 30,850 || 7-9-1
|-align="center" bgcolor="bbffbb"
| 18 || April 24 || @Carp || 0 - 4 || Nomi (2-2) || Maeda (2-2) ||  || 24,417 || 8-9-1
|-align="center" bgcolor="bbffbb"
| 19 || April 25 || @Carp || 1 - 12 || Fukuhara (1-2) || Hasegawa (1-1) ||  || 28,400 || 9-9-1
|-align="center" bgcolor="#ffbbbb"
| 20 || April 26 || @Carp || 2 - 1 || Shinoda (2-1) || Atchison (1-1) || Nagakawa (7) || 30,528 || 9-10-1
|-align="center" bgcolor="bbffbb"
| 21 || April 28 || BayStars || 8 - 4 || Egusa (2-1) || Yoshikawa (0-1) ||  || 19,163 || 10-10-1
|-align="center" bgcolor="#ffbbbb"
| 22 || April 29 || BayStars || 4 - 7 || Walrond (1-2) || Ando (2-1) || Ishii (6) || 46,431 || 10-11-1
|-align="center" bgcolor="bbffbb"
| 23 || April 30 || BayStars || 3 - 2 || Atchison (2-1) || Ishii (0-2) ||  || 45,758 || 11-11-1
|-

|-align="center" bgcolor="#ffbbbb"
| 24 || May 2 || Giants || 5 - 6 || Yamaguchi (3-0) || Fujikawa (1-1) || Ochi (2) || 46,425 || 11-12-1
|-align="center" bgcolor="#ffbbbb"
| 25 || May 3 || Giants || 0 - 4 || Gonzalez (1-0) || Cheng (0-1) ||  || 46,440 || 11-13-1
|-align="center" bgcolor="bbffbb"
| 26 || May 4 || Giants || 6 - 0 || Shimoyanagi (2-2) || Utsumi (0-3) ||  || 46,434 || 12-13-1
|-align="center" bgcolor="#bbbbbb"
| — || May 5 || @Swallows || colspan=6|Postponed (rained out)
|-align="center" bgcolor="#bbbbbb"
| — || May 6 || @Swallows || colspan=6|Postponed (rained out)
|-align="center" bgcolor="#ffbbbb"
| 27 || May 7 || @Swallows || 2 - 1 || Ishikawa (4-1) || Kubo(0-2) || Lim (9) || 15,575 || 12-14-1
|-align="center" bgcolor="#ffbbbb"
| 28 || May 8 || @BayStars || 2 - 0 || Miura (4-2) || Ando (2-2) ||  || 13,467 || 12-15-1
|-align="center" bgcolor="#ffbbbb"
| 29 || May 9 || @BayStars || 4 - 0 || Glynn (2-4) || Nomi (2-3) ||  || 23,464 || 12-16-1
|-align="center" bgcolor="bbffbb"
| 30 || May 10 || @BayStars || 4 - 12 || Fukuhara (2-2) || Kobayashi (1-2) ||  || 23,963 || 13-16-1
|-align="center" bgcolor="bbffbb"
| 31 || May 12 || Carp || 1 - 0 || Shimoyanagi (3-2) || Yokoyama (0-2) ||  || 41,558 || 14-16-1
|-align="center" bgcolor="#ffbbbb"
| 32 || May 13 || Carp || 1 - 2 (10) || Yokoyama (1-2) || Fujikawa (1-2) || Nagakawa (11) || 43,899 || 14-17-1
|-align="center" bgcolor="bbffbb"
| 33 || May 14 || Carp || 7 - 1 || Ando (3-2) || Maeda (2-4) ||  || 40,599 || 15-17-1
|-align="center" bgcolor="#ffbbbb"
| 34 || May 15 || @Swallows || 2 - 1 || Matsuoka (2-0) || Nomi (2-4) || Lim (12) || 22,528 || 15-18-1
|-align="center" bgcolor="#ffbbbb"
| 35 || May 16 || @Swallows || 4 - 1 || Tateyama (4-0) || Fukuhara (2-3) || Lim (13) || 28,380 || 15-19-1
|-align="center" bgcolor="#ffbbbb"
| 36 || May 17 || @Swallows || 2 - 1 || Kawashima (3-2) || Egusa (2-2) || Igarashi (1) || 19,534 || 15-20-1
|-align="center" bgcolor="#bbbbbb"
| 37 || May 19 || @Hawks || 1 - 1 (12) || colspan=3|Game tied after 12 innings || 33,182 || 15-20-2
|-align="center" bgcolor="#ffbbbb"
| 38 || May 20 || @Hawks || 3 - 2 (10) || Settsu (2-2) || Egusa (2-3) ||  || 29,258 || 15-21-2
|-align="center" bgcolor="#ffbbbb"
| 39 || May 22 || @Buffaloes || 8 - 3 || Kaneko (4-3) || Ando (3-3) || Kato (7) || 23,433 || 15-22-2
|-align="center" bgcolor="bbffbb"
| 40 || May 23 || @Buffaloes || 3 - 7 || Atchison (3-1) || Vogelsong (0-1) ||  || 28,031 || 16-22-2
|-align="center" bgcolor="#bbbbbb"
| — || May 24 || Marines || colspan=6|No game (called after 4 innings)
|-align="center" bgcolor="bbffbb"
| 41 || May 25 || Marines || 4 - 3 || Kubo (1-2) || Shimizu (1-3) || Fujikawa (3) || 43,474 || 17-22-2
|-align="center" bgcolor="#ffbbbb"
| 42 || May 26 || Marines || 2 - 3 || Sikorski (4-2) || Fujikawa (1-3) || Ogino (7) || 26,680 || 17-23-2
|-align="center" bgcolor="bbffbb"
| 43 || May 27 || Lions || 4 - 1 || Shimoyanagi (4-2) || Ishii (2-4) || Fujikawa (4) || 46,160 || 18-23-2
|-align="center" bgcolor="#ffbbbb"
| 44 || May 28 || Lions || 4 - 6 || Wakui (5-2) || Ando (3-4) || Onodera (4) || 44,395 || 18-24-2
|-align="center" bgcolor="#ffbbbb"
| 45 || May 30 || @Fighters || 8 - 2 || Darvish (7-1) || Fukuhara (2-4) ||  || 42,328 || 18-25-2
|-align="center" bgcolor="bbbbbb"
| 46 || May 31 || @Fighters || 4 - 4 (12) || colspan=3|Game tied after 12 innings || 42,051 || 18-25-3
|-

|-align="center" bgcolor="#ffbbbb"
| 47 || June 2 || @Eagles || 3 - 2 || Rasner (3-3) || Kubo (1-3) || Aoyama (3) || 20,128 || 18-26-3
|-align="center" bgcolor="bbffbb"
| 48 || June 3 || @Eagles || 2 - 3 ||  ||  ||  ||  || 19-26-3
|-align="center" bgcolor="bbffbb"
| 49 || June 5 || Buffaloes || 4 - 0 ||  ||  ||  ||  || 20-26-3
|-align="center" bgcolor="bbffbb"
| 50 || June 6 || Buffaloes || 7 - 0 ||  ||  ||  ||  || 21-26-3
|-align="center" bgcolor="bbffbb"
| 51 || June 7 || Hawks || 4 - 3 ||  ||  ||  ||  || 22-26-3
|-align="center" bgcolor="#ffbbbb"
| 52 || June 8 || Hawks || 1 - 8 ||  ||  ||  ||  || 22-27-3
|-align="center" bgcolor="#ffbbbb"
| 53 || June 10 || @Lions || 4 - 3 ||  ||  ||  ||  || 22-28-3
|-align="center" bgcolor="#ffbbbb"
| 54 || June 11 || @Lions || 6 - 5 ||  ||  ||  ||  || 22-29-3
|-align="center" bgcolor="#ffbbbb"
| 55 || June 13 || @Marines || 9 - 1 ||  ||  ||  ||  || 22-30-3
|-align="center" bgcolor="#ffbbbb"
| 56 || June 14 || @Marines || 4 - 1 ||  ||  ||  ||  || 22-31-3
|-align="center" bgcolor="bbffbb"
| 57 || June 16 || Fighters || 4 - 3 ||  ||  ||  ||  || 23-31-3
|-align="center" bgcolor="#ffbbbb"
| 58 || June 17 || Fighters || 5 - 10 ||  ||  ||  ||  || 23-32-3
|-align="center" bgcolor="#ffbbbb"
| 59 || June 20 || Eagles || 2 - 5 ||  ||  ||  ||  || 23-33-3
|-align="center" bgcolor="bbffbb"
| 60 || June 21 || Eagles || 4 - 2 ||  ||  ||  ||  || 24-33-3
|-align="center" bgcolor="bbffbb"
| 61 || June 26 || BayStars || 9 - 4 ||  ||  ||  ||  || 25-33-3
|-align="center" bgcolor="#ffbbbb"
| 62 || June 27 || BayStars || 3 - 5 ||  ||  ||  ||  || 25-34-3
|-align="center" bgcolor="bbffbb"
| 63 || June 28 || BayStars || 3 - 2 ||  ||  ||  ||  || 26-34-3
|-align="center" bgcolor="#ffbbbb"
| 64 || June 30 || @Dragons || 5 - 4 ||  ||  ||  ||  || 26-35-3
|-

|-align="center" bgcolor="#ffbbbb"
| 65 || July 1 || @Dragons || 4 - 1 ||  ||  ||  ||  || 26-36-3
|-align="center" bgcolor="bbffbb"
| 66 || July 2 || @Dragons || 3 - 5 ||  ||  ||  ||  || 27-36-3
|-align="center" bgcolor="bbffbb"
| 67 || July 3 || Swallows || 7 - 2 ||  ||  ||  ||  || 28-36-3
|-align="center" bgcolor="#ffbbbb"
| 68 || July 4 || Swallows || 3 - 6 ||  ||  ||  ||  || 28-37-3
|-align="center" bgcolor="bbffbb"
| 69 || July 5 || Swallows || 4 - 1 ||  ||  ||  ||  || 29-37-3
|-align="center" bgcolor="#ffbbbb"
| 70 || July 7 || @Carp || 8 - 1 ||  ||  ||  ||  || 29-38-3
|-align="center" bgcolor="#ffbbbb"
| 71 || July 8 || @Carp || 3 - 1 ||  ||  ||  ||  || 29-39-3
|-align="center" bgcolor="#ffbbbb"
| 72 || July 10 || Giants || 5 - 7 ||  ||  ||  ||  || 29-40-3
|-align="center" bgcolor="#bbbbbb"
| 73 || July 11 || Giants || 2 - 2 || colspan=3|Game tied after 12 innings ||  || 29-40-4
|-align="center" bgcolor="#ffbbbb"
| 74 || July 12 || Giants || 1 - 2 ||  ||  ||  ||  || 29-41-4
|-align="center" bgcolor="bbffbb"
| 75 || July 14 || Dragons || 5 - 4 ||  ||  ||  ||  || 30-41-4
|-align="center" bgcolor="#ffbbbb"
| 76 || July 15 || Dragons || 1 - 6 ||  ||  ||  ||  || 30-42-4
|-align="center" bgcolor="#ffbbbb"
| 77 || July 16 || Dragons || 4 - 6 ||  ||  ||  ||  || 30-43-4
|-align="center" bgcolor="bbffbb"
| 78 || July 17 || @Giants || 1 - 5 ||  ||  ||  ||  || 31-43-4
|-align="center" bgcolor="#ffbbbb"
| 79 || July 18 || @Giants || 11 - 4 ||  ||  ||  ||  || 31-44-4
|-align="center" bgcolor="bbffbb"
| 80 || July 19 || @Giants || 0 - 1 ||  ||  ||  ||  || 32-44-4
|-align="center" bgcolor="#ffbbbb"
| 81 || July 20 || Swallows || 2 - 3 ||  ||  ||  ||  || 32-45-4
|-align="center" bgcolor="#bbbbbb"
| — || July 21 || Swallows ||colspan=6|Postponed (rained out)
|-align="center" bgcolor="#ffbbbb"
| 82 || July 22 || Swallows || 0 - 5 ||  ||  ||  ||  || 32-46-4
|-align="center" bgcolor="bbffbb"
| 83 || July 28 || BayStars || 5 - 4 ||  ||  ||  ||  || 33-46-4
|-align="center" bgcolor="bbffbb"
| 84 || July 29 || BayStars || 8 - 0 ||  ||  ||  ||  || 34-46-4
|-align="center" bgcolor="bbffbb"
| 85 || July 30 || BayStars || 2 - 0 ||  ||  ||  ||  || 35-46-4
|-align="center" bgcolor="bbffbb"
| 86 || July 31 || Giants || 3 - 2 ||  ||  ||  ||  || 36-46-4
|-

|-align="center" bgcolor="#ffbbbb"
| 87 || August 1 || Giants || 2 - 4 ||  ||  ||  ||  || 36-47-4
|-align="center" bgcolor="bbffbb"
| 88 || August 2 || Giants || 7 - 4 ||  ||  ||  ||  || 37-47-4
|-align="center" bgcolor="#ffbbbb"
| 89 || August 3 || @Dragons || 7 - 0 ||  ||  ||  ||  || 37-48-4
|-align="center" bgcolor="#ffbbbb"
| 90 || August 4 || @Dragons || 3 - 1 ||  ||  ||  ||  || 37-49-4
|-align="center" bgcolor="bbffbb"
| 91 || August 5 || @Dragons || 2 - 9 ||  ||  ||  ||  || 38-49-4
|-align="center" bgcolor="bbffbb"
| 92 || August 7 || @Carp || 0 - 4 ||  ||  ||  ||  || 39-49-4
|-align="center" bgcolor="#ffbbbb"
| 93 || August 8 || @Carp || 8 - 0 ||  ||  ||  ||  || 39-50-4
|-align="center" bgcolor="#ffbbbb"
| 94 || August 9 || @Carp || 7 - 3 ||  ||  ||  ||  || 39-51-4
|-align="center" bgcolor="#ffbbbb"
| 95 || August 11 || Dragons || 1 - 3 ||  ||  ||  ||  || 39-52-4
|-align="center" bgcolor="bbffbb"
| 96 || August 12 || Dragons || 6 - 1 ||  ||  ||  ||  || 40-52-4
|-align="center" bgcolor="#ffbbbb"
| 97 || August 13 || Dragons || 2 - 9 ||  ||  ||  ||  || 40-53-4
|-align="center" bgcolor="bbffbb"
| 98 || August 14 || @Giants || 4 - 7 ||  ||  ||  ||  || 41-53-4
|-align="center" bgcolor="#ffbbbb"
| 99 || August 15 || @Giants || 9 - 7 ||  ||  ||  ||  || 41-54-4
|-align="center" bgcolor="bbffbb"
| 100 || August 16 || @Giants || 2 - 5 ||  ||  ||  ||  || 42-54-4
|-align="center" bgcolor="bbffbb"
| 101 || August 18 || @Swallows || 1 - 4 ||  ||  ||  ||  || 43-54-4
|-align="center" bgcolor="#ffbbbb"
| 102 || August 19 || @Swallows || 4 - 2 ||  ||  ||  ||  || 43-55-4
|-align="center" bgcolor="bbffbb"
| 103 || August 20 || @Swallows || 2 - 10 ||  ||  ||  ||  || 44-55-4
|-align="center" bgcolor="#ffbbbb"
| 104 || August 21 || Carp || 0 - 9 ||  ||  ||  ||  || 44-56-4
|-align="center" bgcolor="bbffbb"
| 105 || August 22 || Carp || 2 - 1 ||  ||  ||  ||  || 45-56-4
|-align="center" bgcolor="bbffbb"
| 106 || August 23 || Carp || 8 - 2 ||  ||  ||  ||  || 46-56-4
|-align="center" bgcolor="bbffbb"
| 107 || August 25 || @BayStars || 3 - 4 ||  ||  ||  ||  || 47-56-4
|-align="center" bgcolor="bbffbb"
| 108 || August 26 || @BayStars || 3 - 9 ||  ||  ||  ||  || 48-56-4
|-align="center" bgcolor="#ffbbbb"
| 109 || August 27 || @BayStars || 4 - 1 ||  ||  ||  ||  || 48-57-4
|-align="center" bgcolor="bbffbb"
| 110 || August 28 || Giants || 5 - 1 ||  ||  ||  ||  || 49-57-4
|-align="center" bgcolor="#ffbbbb"
| 111 || August 29 || Giants || 5 - 7 ||  ||  ||  ||  || 49-58-4
|-align="center" bgcolor="bbffbb"
| 112 || August 30 || Giants || 3 - 1 ||  ||  ||  ||  || 50-58-4
|-

|-align="center" bgcolor="bbffbb"
| 113 || September 1 || Swallows || 6 - 1 ||  ||  ||  ||  || 51-58-4
|-align="center" bgcolor="bbffbb"
| 114 || September 2 || Swallows || 9 - 4 ||  ||  ||  ||  || 52-58-4
|-align="center" bgcolor="#ffbbbb"
| 115 || September 3 || Swallows || 2 - 4 ||  ||  ||  ||  || 52-59-4
|-align="center" bgcolor="bbffbb"
| 116 || September 4 || @Carp || 0 - 2 ||  ||  ||  ||  || 53-59-4
|-align="center" bgcolor="#ffbbbb"
| 117 || September 5 || @Carp || 5 - 2 ||  ||  ||  ||  || 53-60-4
|-align="center" bgcolor="bbffbb"
| 118 || September 6 || @Carp || 1 - 4 ||  ||  ||  ||  || 54-60-4
|-align="center" bgcolor="#ffbbbb"
| 119 || September 8 || Dragons || 0 - 7 ||  ||  ||  ||  || 54-61-4
|-align="center" bgcolor="bbffbb"
| 120 || September 9 || Dragons || 4 - 0 ||  ||  ||  ||  || 55-61-4
|-align="center" bgcolor="#ffbbbb"
| 121 || September 10 || Dragons || 2 - 4 ||  ||  ||  ||  || 55-62-4
|-align="center" bgcolor="#bbffbb"
| 122 || September 11 || BayStars || 2 - 1 ||  ||  ||  ||  || 56-62-4
|-align="center" bgcolor="#ffbbbb"
| 123 || September 12 || BayStars || 2 - 4 ||  ||  ||  ||  || 56-63-4
|-align="center" bgcolor="#bbffbb"
| 124 || September 13 || BayStars || 2 - 1 ||  ||  ||  ||  || 57-63-4
|-align="center" bgcolor="#bbffbb"
| 125 || September 15 || @Giants || 3 - 5 ||  ||  ||  ||  || 58-63-4
|-align="center" bgcolor="#bbffbb"
| 126 || September 16 || @Giants || 6 - 7 ||  ||  ||  ||  || 59-63-4
|-align="center" bgcolor="#ffbbbb"
| 127 || September 17 || @Giants || 4 - 2 ||  ||  ||  ||  || 59-64-4
|-align="center" bgcolor="#ffbbbb"
| 128 || September 18 || Carp || 4 - 5 ||  ||  ||  ||  || 59-65-4
|-align="center" bgcolor="#ffbbbb"
| 129 || September 19 || Carp || 3 - 4 ||  ||  ||  ||  || 59-66-4
|-align="center" bgcolor="bbffbb"
| 130 || September 20 || Carp || 14 - 2 ||  ||  ||  ||  || 60-66-4
|-align="center" bgcolor="#ffbbbb"
| 131 || September 21 || @BayStars || 8 - 1 ||  ||  ||  ||  || 60-67-4
|-align="center" bgcolor="#ffbbbb"
| 132 || September 22 || @BayStars || 7 - 2 ||  ||  ||  ||  || 60-68-4
|-align="center" bgcolor="bbffbb"
| 133 || September 23 || @BayStars || 3 - 6 ||  ||  ||  ||  || 61-68-4
|-align="center" bgcolor="bbffbb"
| 134 || September 25 || @Dragons || 2 - 5 ||  ||  ||  ||  || 62-68-4
|-align="center" bgcolor="#ffbbbb"
| 135 || September 26 || @Dragons || 10 - 7 ||  ||  ||  ||  || 62-69-4
|-align="center" bgcolor="bbffbb"
| 136 || September 27 || @Dragons || 2 - 7 ||  ||  ||  ||  || 63-69-4
|-align="center" bgcolor="#ffbbbb"
| 137 || September 28 || @Swallows || 7 - 1 ||  ||  ||  ||  || 63-70-4
|-align="center" bgcolor="bbffbb"
| 138 || September 29 || @Swallows || 2 - 8 ||  ||  ||  ||  || 64-70-4
|-align="center" bgcolor="bbffbb"
| 139 || September 30 || @Swallows || 1 - 7 ||  ||  ||  ||  || 65-70-4
|-

|-align="center" bgcolor="#ffbbbb"
| 140 || October 3 || Swallows || 4 - 6 ||  ||  ||  ||  || 65-71-4
|-align="center" bgcolor="bbffbb"
| 141 || October 4 || Dragons || 5 - 0 ||  ||  ||  ||  || 66-71-4
|-align="center" bgcolor="bbffbb"
| 142 || October 7 || @Carp || 1 - 5 ||  ||  ||  ||  || 67-71-4
|-align="center" bgcolor="#ffbbbb"
| 143 || October 8 || @Swallows || 5 - 0 ||  ||  ||  ||  || 67-72-4
|-align="center" bgcolor="#ffbbbb"
| 144 || October 9 || @Swallows || 3 - 1 ||  ||  ||  ||  || 67-73-4
|-

Player stats

Batting

Pitching

References

Hanshin Tigers
Hanshin Tigers seasons